The Centre Hospitalo-Universitaire Béjaïa is a public university teaching hospital center (CHU) in Béjaïa, Béjaïa Province, Algeria.  It is one of 15 public University Hospital Centers (French: Centre Hospitalo-Universitaire or CHU) under the Béjaïa Department of Health and Population in the Algerian Ministry of Health, Population and Hospital Modernization. It is affiliated with the University of Béjaïa.  The Center includes three hospitals: Frantz Fanon Hospital with 114 beds, Khelil Amrane Hospital with 205 beds, and Targa Ouzemmour Hospital of obstetric gynecology with 106 beds.

History
The CHU Béjaia was created by Algerian Presidential executive decree Number 2009–319 on October 6, 2009, supplementing the list of university hospital centers annexed to executive decree Number 1997–467 on December 23, 1997, setting the rules for the creation, organization and operation of university hospital centers.  This decree set up three hospitals in the CHU Béjaia, namely:
Khelil Amrane Hospital (Route de l'Hôpital, Béjaïa 06000, Algeria); namesake: Chahid Khelil Amrane
Frantz Fanon Hospital (Rue Frères Arbouche, Béjaïa 06000, Algeria); namesake:  Frantz Fanon
Tergha Ouzemmour Hospital (Q22W+VF Béjaïa, Algeria)
These three hospitals are affiliated with the school of medicine of the University of Bejaia (in Targa Ouzemour, Béjaïa, Algeria ).  There is also a Blood Transfusion Center associated with the CHU

Medical services
These three hospitals have departments that provide 22 medical specialties.  Medical students train in these hospitals at both the undergraduate and graduate levels.

References

Hospitals in Algeria
Teaching hospitals
Hospitals established in 2009